The Mona Lisa is a portrait of a woman by Leonardo da Vinci.

Mona Lisa or Monalisa may also refer to:

Film and television
 Mona Lisa (film), a 1986 British film
 Monalisa (film), a 2004 Indian film
 "Mona Lisa" (The Outer Limits), a 2001 episode of The Outer Limits
 Mona Lisa (TMNT), a Teenage Mutant Ninja Turtles character
 Mona Lisa, a Courage the Cowardly Dog character
 Mona Lisa, a character in Daybreak
 Mona-Lisa Saperstein, a character in Parks and Recreation
 Mona Lisa Vito, a character in My Cousin Vinny

Music
 Mona Lisa (band), a French band active in the 1970s
 Mona Lisa (EP), a 2011 EP by MBLAQ
 MonaLisa Twins, a pop rock band, formed by twin sisters Mona Wagner and Lisa Wagner

Songs
 "Mona Lisa" (Nat King Cole song) (1950)
 "Mona Lisa" (Lil Wayne song) (2018)
 "The Mona Lisa" (song), a 2013 song by Brad Paisley
 "Mona Lisa", a 2005 song by Britney Spears from Britney & Kevin: Chaotic
 "Mona Lisa (When The World Comes Down)", a 2008 song by the All-American Rejects from When The World Comes Down
 "Mona Lisa", a 2011 song by Bayside from Killing Time
 "Mona Lisa", a 2014 song by Nicki Minaj from The Pinkprint
 "Mona Lisa", a 2018 song by Sabrina Carpenter from Singular: Act I
 "Mona Lisa", a 1988 song by Slick Rick from The Great Adventures of Slick Rick
 "Masterpiece (Mona Lisa)", a 2015 song by Jazmine Sullivan from Reality Show
 "Mona Lisa", a 1997 song by Wyclef Jean featuring the Neville Brothers from Wyclef Jean Presents The Carnival

People
 Lisa del Giocondo or Mona Lisa (1479–1542), the subject of the painting
 Mona Lisa (actress) (1922–2019), Filipino film actress
 Mona Lisa (singer) (born 1979), American R&B singer
 Mona Lisa, silent film actress who acted in Too Wise Wives
 Mozeza Ashraf Monalisa (born 1987), Bangladeshi actress, model and dancer
 Monalisa Chinda (born 1974), Nigerian actress
 Monalisa Perrone (born 1969), Brazilian journalist
 Yvonne Cherrie (born 1981), Tanzanian film actress
 Antara Biswas (born 1982), Indian film actress

Other uses
 Mona Lisa (Prado), a painting of the same subject as Leonardo da Vinci's Mona Lisa
 Mona Lisa (opera), a 1915 opera by Max von Schillings
 Mona Lisa (crater), a crater on Venus
 MS Mona Lisa, a ship

See also
 Deeba (born 1947), Pakistani film actress known by the nickname Pakistani Mona Lisa
 Mona Lizza, Pakistani actress
 Salaì (1480–1524)
 Moaning Lisa (disambiguation)